Grace Elinor Chapman Nash (November 19, 1909 - November 9, 2010) was an American music educator, writer, and violinist.

Born in Garrettsville, Ohio, Grace Chapman was one of five siblings, all of whom received piano lessons from their mother.  She was educated at Hiram College and Ohio Wesleyan University, receiving her bachelor's degree in French and music from the latter in 1930 and embarking on a career as a teacher of English and music at the junior high school level.  In 1936 she completed her master's degree in performance and composition at the Chicago Musical College. In 1936 she married Ralph Nash; soon thereafter she took a position as assistant concertmaster with the Manila Symphony Orchestra. In 1942, during the Japanese invasion of the Philippines, she and her family were imprisoned by the Japanese, being released in 1945; she later told the story of their ordeal in That We Might Live, published in 1984. Returning to the United States, Nash taught music theory and violin in the area around Chicago. In the 190s she undertook a new course of study with Carl Orff, Zoltán Kodály, and Rudolf Laban, which was to inform her future career in education. Orff's Schulwerk, interwoven with the theories of the others, serves as the basis for her 1974 book Creative Approaches to Child Development with Music, Language, and Movement. From 1979 until 1999 Nash was prominent in the field of teacher training, writing many educational works about the Orff style. In 1989 she became the first recipient of the Distinguished Service Award from the American Orff-Schulwerk Association. Upon her husband's death in 1992, Nash moved to a retirement community in Tallahassee, Florida; she taught her last workshops at Florida State University. She died in Tallahassee, survived by a sister and by her three sons.

Nash received a lifetime achievement award from Hiram College in 1991.

References

1909 births
2010 deaths
American music educators
American women music educators
American classical violinists
Women classical violinists
20th-century American violinists
20th-century American women musicians
20th-century American educators
20th-century American women educators
People from Garrettsville, Ohio
Classical musicians from Ohio
Educators from Ohio
Hiram College alumni
Ohio Wesleyan University alumni
Chicago Musical College alumni
American prisoners of war in World War II
World War II prisoners of war held by Japan
American centenarians
Women centenarians